The 1971 Islip 250 was a NASCAR Winston Cup Series race that was conducted on July 15, 1971, at Islip Speedway in Islip, New York

Two black racers were involved in this race (Wendell Scott and George Wiltshire).

Background
Islip Speedway was a .2-mile (320-meter) oval race track in Islip, New York which was open from 1947 until 1984. It is the smallest track ever to host NASCAR's Grand National Series, from 1964 to 1971. The first demolition derby took place at Islip Speedway in 1958. The idea was patented by Larry Mendelson, who worked at Islip Speedway.

Race report
Two hundred and fifty green flag laps were done on a paved oval track spanning . However, the race was shortened by twenty laps to 230 laps due to an error with the scoring system. At the time, Islip Speedway had a scoring system that looked like a Rolodex card system that would flip down cards with minutes (with numbers from 00 to 99) and seconds (with numbers from 00 to 59) on them. This would give the time elapsed in the race with some manual output; similar to the scoring system used at the very first Daytona 500 because electronic scoring would be decades away from being a reality. The first column would count the number of minutes elapsed with the second column would count the number of seconds elapsed. It would be rare to see a race last for more than ninety-nine minutes and fifty-nine seconds (approximately 1.6 hours) until NASCAR started lengthening their races in the 1970s.

The time of the race was fifty-five minutes and seventeen seconds. Richard Petty managed to defeat Friday Hassler by out-lapping him twice. Frog Fagan was the lone Canadian in the race making his final start in a Cup Series vehicle. 

Fagan would race for a single lap before quitting in Neil Castles' #06 Dodge vehicle. In addition to leading the race, Richard Petty led all 230 laps of the race. Ken Meisenhelder's vehicle overheated on lap 27 just like Pete Hamilton's vehicle would overheat on lap 36. John Sears noticed the axle on his vehicle was acting weirdly on lap 48 while the ignition on Bill Champion's vehicle stopped working on lap 71. Bobby Mausgrover noticed that his vehicle's brakes stopped working on lap 102 while battery problems would relegate Ed Negre to the sidelines on lap 106.

Bill Seifert noticed that his vehicle's transmission was developing problems on lap 113 while Jerry Churchill blew his engine on lap 119. J.D. McDuffie had to leave the race due to a missing vehicular rear end on lap 132 while Larry Baumel's vehicle would be cursed with transmission problems on lap 142. Henley Gray would notice that his vehicle's brakes stop working on lap 200; forcing his premature exit from the race.

Benny Listman would do his only NASCAR Cup Series race here. Four automobile manufacturers were predominant during this race: Ford, Dodge, Plymouth and Mercury. Notable crew chiefs that participated in the event were Lee Gordon, Vic Ballard, Dale Inman and Wesley Wiltshire.

The winner would receive a prize bounty of $1,500 ($ when adjusted for inflation) while the last place finisher would receive a paltry $10 ($ when adjusted for inflation) prize bounty. Total winnings for this track would be $8,685 ($ when adjusted for inflation). This would be the final race in NASCAR's top series for this track; the track would be demolished in 1984 to become a cookie factory. All races shorter than 250 miles would be axed by the NASCAR organization; in the sport's modernization process.

Qualifying

Finishing order

 Richard Petty (No. 43)
 Friday Hassler† (No. 39)
 Elmo Langley† (No. 67)
 Bobby Allison (No. 12)
 G.C. Spencer† (No. 49)
 James Hylton† (No. 48)
 Neil Castles (No. 6)
 Cecil Gordon† (No. 24)
 Jabe Thomas† (No. 23)
 Walter Ballard (No. 30)
 Wendell Scott† (No. 34)
 D.K. Ulrich (No. 40)
 Henley Gray* (No. 19)
 Bill Hollar† (No. 28)
 Larry Baumel* (No. 68)
 J.D. McDuffie*† (No. 70)
 Jerry Churchill*† (No. 73)
 Bill Seifert* (No. 45)
 Ed Negre*† (No. 8)
 Bob Mausgrover* (No. 86)
 Bill Champion*† (No. 10)
 John Sears*† (No. 4)
 Pete Hamilton* (No. 91)
 Ken Meisenhelder* (No. 41)
 Bill Shirey* (No. 74)
 Bennis Listman* (No. 62)
 Dick May*† (No. 64)
 George Wiltshire* (No. 89)
 Charlie Roberts* (No. 77)
 James Cox* (No. 26)
 Richard Childress* (No. 96)
 Frog Fagan*† (No. 06)
 Frank Warren* (No. 79)

† signifies that the driver is known to be deceased 
* Driver failed to finish race

References

Islip 250
Islip 250
NASCAR races at Islip Speedway